The 2007 Prince Edward Island Scotties Tournament of Hearts was held Jan. 18–22 in at the Western Community Curling Club in Alberton, Prince Edward Island. The winning team was Team Suzanne Gaudet who represented Prince Edward Island, finished with a 6-5 round-robin record and a 4th-place finish in the page playoff at the 2007 Scotties Tournament of Hearts in Lethbridge, Alberta.

Teams

Draw 1
January 18, 2:00 PM AT

Draw 2
January 18, 8:00 PM AT

Draw 3
January 19, 2:00 PM AT

A Side Final
January 19, 7:00 PM AT

Draw 4
January 19, 7:00 PM AT

Draw 5
January 20, 2:00 PM AT

B Side Final
January 20, 7:00 PM AT

Draw 6
January 20, 7:00 PM AT

Draw 7
January 21, 2:00 PM AT

C Side Final
January 21, 7:00 PM AT

Final
January 22, 2:00 PM AT  Not Needed

 Team Gaudet won A, B and C finals therefore a championship final was not needed.

References

Prince Edward Island Scotties Tournament Of Hearts, 2007
2007 in Canadian curling
Curling competitions in Prince Edward Island
Alberton, Prince Edward Island